Myra is an unincorporated community located within the town of Trenton in Washington County, Wisconsin, United States.

History
The hamlet of Myra was platted by Chauncy Gray and Jacob E. Young. The name for the hamlet, Myra, was originally named by Young's wife who found the name Myra in her Bible. Myra was predominantly a Bohemian settlement. It was a busy and industrious little village in its early days.

The pond located near the hamlet was a fine fishing and recreational area. The fish were so prolific that sometimes the waterwheel was blocked by the huge pickerel weighing  as much as twelve pounds. All went well until 1913 when, during a severe rain storm the dam broke and the pond drained into the Milwaukee River. The dam was never rebuilt.

The Trenton House, Myra's second tavern in the hamlet, was built in 1881 by Max Weinand. The Trenton House served as a hotel for the kiln and mill workers in the area. Later it was sold to Paul Hetebrueg who added a dance hall. Public dances were held at dancing hall. The Trenton House dance hall also rented to the Myra Literary Society who presented plays every spring.

References

Unincorporated communities in Washington County, Wisconsin
Unincorporated communities in Wisconsin